Lyria guionneti is a species of sea snail, a marine gastropod mollusk in the family Volutidae.

Original description
 (Lyria (Plicolyria) guionneti Poppe & Conde, 2001) Poppe, G.T.; Conde, J. (2001). A new species of Lyria (Gastropoda: Volutidae) from New Caledonian waters. Novapex (Jodoigne) 2(3): 115-117 (look up in IMIS).

References

External links
 Worms Link

Volutidae